Benito Sanz y Forés J.C.D. S.T.D. (21 March 1828 – 1 November 1895) was a Cardinal of the Roman Catholic Church and Archbishop of Seville.

Benito Sanz was born in Gandía, Valencia Province. He was educated at the University of Valencia where he studied philosophy and law, obtaining a bachelor's degree in law in 1848. He continued his studies at the Seminary of Valencia where he received a doctorate in canon law in 1853 and in a doctorate in theology in 1857.

Priesthood
He was ordained on March 27, 1852 in Valencia. He worked in the Archdiocese of Valencia as a professor of canon law in its seminary from 1851–1857 and as canon magistral and vicar general. He also worked as an abbreviator in the nunciature in Spain, Madrid and served as a preacher in the Royal Court in 1864 as well as an auditor of the Sacred Rota in Madrid in 1866.

Episcopate
He was appointed Bishop of Oviedo by Pope Pius IX on June 22, 1868. He attended the First Vatican Council in Rome from 1869–1870. He was promoted to the metropolitan see of Valladolid on November 18, 1881 and transferred to the metropolitan see of Seville on December 30, 1889.

Cardinalate
He was created Cardinal-Priest of Sant'Eusebio by Pope Leo XIII in the consistory of January 16, 1893. He died in Madrid two years later and was buried in the metropolitan cathedral of Seville.

External links
The Cardinals of the Holy Roman Church
Catholic Hierarchy data for this cardinal 

1828 births
1895 deaths
People from Gandia
19th-century Spanish cardinals
Cardinals created by Pope Leo XIII
Archbishops of Valladolid
Roman Catholic archbishops of Seville
Bishops of Oviedo
Participants in the First Vatican Council